The Macedonian Prva Liga may refer to two top-tier sporting competitions in North Macedonia:

the Macedonian Prva Liga (basketball)
the Macedonian Prva Liga (football)